Michael Fiedler (born 30 October 1959) is a retired German footballer.

Fiedler made a total of 33 appearances in the 2. Bundesliga for Hertha BSC and Tennis Borussia Berlin during his playing career.

References

External links 
 

1959 births
Living people
German footballers
Association football forwards
2. Bundesliga players
Hertha BSC players
Tennis Borussia Berlin players
20th-century German people